Lars Brüggemann (born 2 March 1976) is a German ice hockey player. He competed in the men's tournament at the 1998 Winter Olympics.

References

1976 births
Living people
Olympic ice hockey players of Germany
Ice hockey players at the 1998 Winter Olympics
People from Hemer
Sportspeople from Arnsberg (region)
Hull Olympiques players
Jacksonville Lizard Kings players
Nürnberg Ice Tigers players
Iserlohn Roosters players
Krefeld Pinguine players
Adler Mannheim players
Hannover Scorpions players
Grizzlys Wolfsburg players
German ice hockey officials
German expatriate sportspeople in Canada
German expatriate sportspeople in the United States
German expatriate ice hockey people